The Two Qiaos of Jiangdong were two sisters of the Qiao family who lived during the late Eastern Han dynasty of China. In tales, the two Qiaos were sisters of exceptional beauty who were the pivot to the Battle of Chibi, one of the most impactful battles of the Three Kingdoms period. Cao Cao, the founder of Cao Wei's state, was interested in having the two sisters. This situation is evident in "Ode to the Bronze Sparrow Platform" (銅雀臺賦); consequently leading Zhou Yu of Eastern Wu to go to war with Cao Cao.

In historical records
The Qiao sisters' names were not recorded in history, so in later times they are simply referred to as Da Qiao (literally "older Qiao") and Xiao Qiao (literally "younger Qiao"). They were from Wan County (皖縣), Lujiang Commandery (廬江郡), which is in present-day Anqing, Anhui. Da Qiao married the warlord Sun Ce, who established the foundation of the state of Eastern Wu during the Three Kingdoms period. Xiao Qiao married Zhou Yu, a general who served under Sun Ce and later, under his successor, Sun Quan. Sun Ce jokingly told Zhou Yu: "Although Elder Qiao's daughters are exceptionally beautiful, with us as their husbands, it should be a happy enough match."

In Romance of the Three Kingdoms
The Qiao sisters are featured as characters in the 14th-century historical novel, Romance of the Three Kingdoms, which romanticises the historical events before and during the Three Kingdoms period. In the novel, the Chinese character for "Qiao" in their names, 橋/桥, is replaced with 喬/乔.

In the novel, the Qiao sisters are the daughters of a certain Qiao Guolao (喬國老; literally "State Elder Qiao"), possibly referring to Qiao Xuan. Zhou Yu's biography in the third-century historical text, Records of the Three Kingdoms, did not mention the name of the Qiao sisters' father, who was simply referred to as Qiao Gong (橋公; literally "Elder Qiao" or "Lord Qiao"). Historically, Qiao Xuan died in 184, while the Qiao sisters married Sun Ce and Zhou Yu around 199, so it was not possible that Qiao Xuan was still living when the marriages took place. Therefore, it is highly unlikely that Qiao Xuan was the "Qiao Gong" mentioned in Zhou Yu's biography. 

In Chapter 44 of the novel, Zhuge Liang tells Zhou Yu that Cao Cao's desire to have the Two Qiaos for himself is evident in "Ode to the Bronze Sparrow Platform" (銅雀臺賦), a poem written by Cao Cao's son, Cao Zhi. An enraged Zhou Yu then hardens his decision to convince Sun Quan to ally with Liu Bei against Cao Cao. (See  for details.)

Cao Zhi's poem Ascending the Terrace is woven into the narrative where Zhuge Liang goads Zhou Yu—an altered version of the poem with added verses is recited (under line 10 above), "proving" Cao Cao's lecherous intentions:

As a result, an enraged Zhou Yu vows to go to war with Cao Cao and defeats him in the Battle of Red Cliffs in 208. Historically, the battle predates the terrace by two years, and Cao Zhi's poem was written two years after Zhou Yu's death. Nonetheless, the story of the Bronze Bird Terrace and the Qiao sisters in the popular tradition aroused people's imagination for generations.

In popular culture

The Qiao sisters are featured as playable characters in Koei's Dynasty Warriors and Warriors Orochi video game series. The anime Koihime Musō and Ikki Tousen make references to Da Qiao and Xiao Qiao as well, in which they are known by their respective names in Japanese – Daikyō and Shōkyō.

Taiwanese supermodel Lin Chi-ling starred as Xiao Qiao in the 2008 Chinese epic war film, Red Cliff, directed by John Woo. In the film, it is surmised that Cao Cao's infatuation with Xiao Qiao is the reason why he invaded Sun Quan's lands and initiated the battle. Chinese actress Huang Yi portrayed Xiao Qiao in Just Another Pandora's Box, a spoof of Red Cliff.

Cai Hancen and Tsai Yi-chen portrayed Da Qiao and Xiao Qiao, respectively, in the 2009 Taiwanese television series, K.O.3an Guo, a spoof of Romance of the Three Kingdoms in a modern high school setting.

Chinese actresses Liu Jing and Zhao Ke portrayed Da Qiao and Xiao Qiao, respectively, in the 2010 Chinese television series, Three Kingdoms.

The Qiaos are featured as "gods" in the Japanese mobile game Puzzle & Dragons, as part of the Three Kingdoms God series.

The Two Qiaos are featured in Sega's Total War: Three Kingdoms after 19 March 2020, when the developer Creative Assembly released a DLC under the title of A World Betrayed, which gives the Two Qiao official portraits and 3D models with unique abilities.

See also
 Eastern Wu family trees#Sun Ce
 Lists of people of the Three Kingdoms

References

 Chen, Shou (3rd century). Records of the Three Kingdoms (Sanguozhi).
 Fan, Ye (5th century). Book of the Later Han (Houhanshu).
 Luo, Guanzhong (14th century). Romance of the Three Kingdoms (Sanguo Yanyi).
 Pei, Songzhi (5th century). Annotations to Records of the Three Kingdoms (Sanguozhi zhu).
 

2nd-century births
Year of birth unknown
Year of death unknown
Sun Ce and associates
Sibling duos